The Ford Taunus V4 engine is a 60° V4 piston engine with one balance shaft, introduced by Ford Motor Company in Germany in 1962. The German V4 was built in the Cologne plant and powered the Ford Taunus and German versions of the Consul, Capri, and Transit.

Design

In common with other V4 and V6 engines, but unlike longer V engines with more cylinders, the connecting rods do not share a crankpin on the crankshaft.

The V4 was later expanded into the Ford Cologne V6 engine that was used in the Ford Capri, Ford Taunus, Ford Cortina, Ford Consul, Ford Granada, Ford Sierra, Ford Scorpio, Ford Ranger, Ford Explorer, Ford Mustang, Mercury Capri, and many other cars. The V4 engine was also used in industrial applications: pumps, electrical generators, agricultural machinery and snowcats. In automobiles, the Taunus V4 was replaced by the Ford OHC/Pinto engine.

Initially the V4 engine was designed by Ford for a new entry compact car intended for the US market to be called the Ford "Cardinal", which eventually evolved into the Taunus 12m P4. Ford abandoned the "Cardinal" project and instead built the Ford Falcon for North America. Ford then sought other uses for the V4 engine which was initially tested in the Saab 96. Ford bought several Saab 96s for testing and eventually sold the cars back to Saab with the V4 engines in them. Saab tested the V4s at their Trollhättan test track which stimulated Saab to acquire the V4 engine for their 95, 96, and 97 (Sonett) introduced in August 1966 (1967 production model). The V4 engine eliminated the need to mix oil with fuel for the two-cycle Saab "Shrike" engine and provided better low end torque. Saab dealers offered the first owner a "Lifetime Warranty" for the V4 for US$50.

Applications:
 Ford Taunus
 Ford Consul
 Ford Transit
 Ford Capri
 Saab 95
 Saab 96
 Saab Sonett (II-V4 and III)
 Matra 530
 Ford Mustang I

1.2
The  version features an  bore and stroke.

Applications:
 1962 - 1966 Ford Taunus 12M P4
 1967 - 1968 Ford Taunus 12M P6

1.3
The  version had an  bore and stroke.

Applications:
 1966 - 1970 Ford Taunus 12M P6
 1969 - 1972 Ford Capri (Mercury Capri)
 Ford Transit 600

1.5
The  V4 had a  bore and stroke.

 1962-1966 Ford Taunus 12M P4
 1966-1970 Ford Taunus 12M P6
 1966-1970 Ford Taunus 15M P6
 1964-1967 Ford Taunus 17M P5
 1967-1971 Ford Taunus 17M P7
 1969-1972 Ford Capri
 Ford Transit 1000
 1967-1980 Saab 95 and Saab 96 (European market)
 1967-1974 Saab 95, Saab 96 and Saab Sonett (USA market)
 The 1962 "Mustang I" Concept car (tuned to )
 1970s Thiokol 1404 Imp snowcat

1.7
The  V4 had a  bore and stroke.

 1966-1970 Ford Taunus 12M P6
 1966-1970 Ford Taunus 15M P6
 1964-1967 Ford Taunus 17M P5
 1967-1971 Ford Taunus 17M P7
 1965-1972 Ford Transit Mark I
 1967-1972 Matra 530
 1969-1972 Ford Capri
 1972-1975 Ford Consul (German version)
 1975-1981 Ford Granada (German version)

Also, some DKW Munga, a Jeep like vehicle used in the German army were retrofitted with this Ford V4, to replace its standard two-stroke engine.

Since the Saab 96 was used for rallying it was also tuned.

See also
 Ford Essex V4 engine
 Ford Cologne V6 engine

References

External links 

Taunus V4
V4 engines
Gasoline engines by model